Anglesea Road is a road joining Donnybrook with Ballsbridge, in Dublin, Ireland. It forms part of the R108 regional route in Southeast Dublin. The River Dodder flows nearby Anglesea Road. A number of sports clubs and sports venues are located in and around the Anglesea Road area. These include Old Belvedere R.F.C., Merrion Cricket Club, Anglesea Road Cricket Ground and the RDS Arena.

See also
List of streets and squares in Dublin

References

Streets in Dublin (city)